New Britain is a city in Hartford County, Connecticut, United States. According to 2020 Census, the population of the city is 74,135.

Among the southernmost of the communities encompassed within the Hartford-Springfield Knowledge Corridor metropolitan region, New Britain is home to Central Connecticut State University and Charter Oak State College.  The city was noted for its industry during the 19th and early 20th centuries, and notable sites listed on the National Register of Historic Places include Walnut Hill Park developed by the landscape architect Frederick Law Olmsted and Downtown New Britain.

The city's official nickname is the "Hardware City" because of its history as a manufacturing center and as the headquarters of Stanley Black & Decker. Because of its large Polish population, the city is often playfully referred to as "New Britski."

History
New Britain was settled in 1687 and then was incorporated as a new parish under the name New Britain Society in 1754. The name is a transfer from Great Britain. Chartered in 1850 as a township and in 1871 as a city, New Britain had separated from the nearby towns of Farmington and Berlin, Connecticut. A consolidation charter was adopted in 1905.

During the early part of the 20th century, New Britain was known as the "Hardware Capital of the World", as well as "Hardware City". Major manufacturers, such as The Stanley Works, the P&F Corbin Company (later Corbin Locks), Landers, Frary & Clark (LF&C) and North & Judd, were headquartered in the city.

In 1843 Frederick Trent Stanley established Stanley's Bolt Manufactory in New Britain to make door bolts and other wrought-iron hardware. In 1857 his cousin Henry Stanley founded The Stanley Rule and Level Company in the city. Planes invented by Leonard Bailey and manufactured by the Stanley Rule and Level Company, known as "Stanley/Bailey" planes, were prized by woodworkers of the late 19th and early 20th centuries and remain popular among wood craftsmen today. The two companies merged in 1920, and the Stanley Rule and Level Company became the Hand Tools Division of Stanley Works.

The wire coat hanger was invented in 1869 by O. A. North of New Britain.
In 1895, the basketball technique of dribbling was developed at the New Britain YMCA. 
In 1938, New Britain High School competed in the high school football national championship game in Baton Rouge, Louisiana. 
1954 saw the development of racquetball, also at the YMCA.

The heads of the fire and police departments and seven other municipal employees were arrested as part of a corruption scandal in the 1970s.

City motto

New Britain's motto, —translated from Latin—means "Industry fills the hive and enjoys the honey." This phrase was coined by Elihu Burritt, a 19th-century New Britain resident, diplomat, philanthropist and social activist.

In 2007 it was reported that the Latin word for "honey" in the motto had been a typo for decades; it should be , but it had long been misspelled as mele. Former mayor William McNamara, who unsuccessfully tried to fix it during his term, suggested "to either fix the spelling immediately" or "switch to the English version of the motto." As controversy arose from the matter, the word was superseded with the correct spelling, .

Geography and topography
According to the United States Census Bureau, the city has a total area of 13.4 square miles (34.7 km), of which, 13.3 square miles (34.6 km) of it is land and 0.1 square miles (0.2 km) of it (0.52%) is water.

New Britain's terrain is mostly made up of soft, rolling hills and young Connecticut forest. The many parks are populated with trees, and in small, undeveloped areas, there is also brushy woods. New Britain's streets also have many trees lining the sides of the roads. Many front yards in the northern half of the city have at least one tree. One or two streams flow through New Britain, undisturbed by the development.

Demographics

As of the census of 2010, there were 73,153 people.  The racial makeup of the city was 47.7% Non-Hispanic White, 36.8% Hispanic or Latino(of any race), 10.9% African American, 0.1% Native American, 2.3% Asian, 0.06% Pacific Islander and 1.9% from two or more races.

There were 29,888 households, out of which 28.3% had children under the age of 18 living with them, 39.6% were married couples living together, 14.7% had a female householder with no husband present, and 40.7% were non-families. 32.1% of all households were made up of individuals, and 10.7% had someone living alone who was 65 years of age or older.  The average household size was 2.50 and the average family size was 3.18.

In the city, the population was spread out, with 24.2% under the age of 18, 12.5% from 18 to 24, 28.9% from 25 to 44, 18.6% from 45 to 64, and 15.8% who were 65 years of age or older.  The median age was 34 years. For every 100 females, there were 91.9 males.  For every 100 females age 18 and over, there were 88.6 males.

In 2010 The median income for a household in the city was $35,357, and the median income for a family was $42,056. Males had a median income of $36,848 versus $28,873 for females. The per capita income for the city was $19,404. 24.5% of the population below the poverty line (Poverty Rate is 19.2% for White Non-Hispanic residents, 36.8% for Hispanic or Latino residents).

Government and politics

Ethnic groups
In the 1960s various European ethnic groups had ethnic enclaves, including those from Ireland, Italy, Poland, and Ukraine.

Polish community
New Britain has the largest Polish population of any city in Connecticut, and by 1930 a quarter of the city was ethnically Polish. Also referred to as "Little Poland", the city's Broad Street neighborhood has been home to a considerable number of Polish businesses and families since 1890. On September 23, 2008, through the urging of the Polonia Business Association, the New Britain City Council unanimously passed a resolution officially designating New Britain's Broad Street area as "Little Poland." In recent years, the Polish community has been credited with revitalizing the area both culturally and economically. Media is served by three Polish language newspapers and a television station, and many businesses and civil agencies are bilingual. The post office branch in Little Poland is the only one in the nation with the word "post" written in Polish to welcome visitors. Each year, a Little Poland festival is held on the last Sunday of April.

Notable visitors to the Polish district have included Presidents Richard Nixon and Ronald Reagan on July 8, 1987. In 1969, as then-Cardinal Karol Wojtyła, the future Pope John Paul II gave a mass at Sacred Heart Church. A statue was erected in his honor in 2007. Dubbed the city's "Polish heart" by The Boston Globe, Little Poland caught the attention of Polish Ambassador to the US Ryszard Schnepf, who toured the area with US Senators Chris Murphy and Richard Blumenthal, US Congresswoman Elizabeth Esty, as well as several members of the Polish Sejm.
An honorary Polish consulate was established in March 2017. The first of its kind in Connecticut, it was established by Polish diplomat to the United States Piotr Wilczek.

In September 2019, Polish President Andrzej Duda became the first head of state to visit New Britain when he addressed thousands in Walnut Hill Park prior to traveling to New York City for the United Nations General Assembly. Duda was joined by a variety of Connecticut politicians, including Governor Ned Lamont, U.S. Representative Jahana Hayes and Senators Chris Murphy and Richard Blumenthal.

Accent
Natives of New Britain have a fairly unmarked Connecticut accent, though there is some local perception of a distinct accent, popularly attributed to the Polish-American community, such as the use of a glottal stop in place of  before syllabic : in other words, in words like cattle and bottle.

Economy

New Britain is home to the global headquarters of the Fortune 500 manufacturing conglomerate Stanley Black & Decker. Other notable companies headquartered in New Britain include Gaffney, Bennett and Associates, Tomasso Group, Creed Monarch, Guida's Dairy, and Polamer Precision.

Top employers
According to the City's 2018 Comprehensive Annual Financial Report, the top employers in the city are:

Sites of interest

 Central Connecticut State University
 New Britain Little League.
 New Britain Museum of American Art, the oldest art museum in the United States devoted to American art.
 New Britain Industrial Museum, a museum of New Britain's industrial past and present 
 The Hospital of Central Connecticut, the city's largest employer.
 Walnut Hill Park – Designed by Frederick Law Olmsted, who also designed Central Park in New York City. 
 Walnut Hill Rose Garden, the recently restored landmark with over 800 roses.
 Connecticut Theatre Company, located in the historic Repertory Theatre of New Britain.
 Hole in the Wall Theater.
 New Britain Youth Museum, contains children's artifacts and exhibits on regional culture.
 The Polish district or "Little Poland":  Located primarily in the vicinity of Broad Street, visitors can find unique amber jewelry, handcrafted items, blown glass, Christmas ornaments, carved chess sets, as well as eat Polish food.

Sports
 New Britain Bees, minor league professional baseball team playing in New Britain Stadium.
 Hartford City FC, professional soccer team playing at CCSU Soccer field.
 New Britain Fagan Cal Ripken Baseball League, a youth baseball program that serves children from the City of New Britain between the ages of 4 and 12.
 New Britain Little League (NBLL, previously known as Walicki – A.W. Stanley Little League), a youth baseball and softball organization that serves the children of New Britain who are between the ages of 4 and 16.
 Connecticut United Football Club, a professional soccer team affiliated with the American Soccer League

Education

Colleges and universities
The city is home to Central Connecticut State University and Charter Oak State College, a public liberal arts college.

Primary and secondary schools
New Britain Public Schools operates public schools. The local high school is New Britain High School. New Britain was also home to the Mountain Laurel Sudbury School but has since closed in 2019.

The Roman Catholic Archdiocese of Hartford is responsible for the operation of Catholic schools. A Catholic elementary school, Sacred Heart School, is in New Britain. St. Thomas Aquinas High School closed in 1999.

The Holy Cross Catholic School was established in 1954. The Holy Cross, St. Francis of Assisi and St. Joseph Catholic schools merged into Saint John Paul II School in 2006; the Holy Cross parish sponsored the consolidated school. The archdiocese closed the SJP School in 2015. At the time of its closing, SJP school had debts of over $300,000.

Transportation
Connecticut Route 9 is the city's main expressway connecting traffic between Hartford (via I-84 and I-91) and Old Saybrook and Middletown. I-84 itself clips the northwestern corner of the city. Public transportation is provided by Connecticut Transit.

Downtown New Britain serves as the southern terminus of CTfastrak, a bus rapid transit line. Operated by Connecticut Transit, the project officially broke ground in May 2012, and became operational in March 2015. The route's northern terminus is Union Station in Hartford.  There are also CTfastrak stations on East Main Street and East Street, the latter near Central Connecticut State University. New Britain is served by Connecticut Transit New Britain.

New Britain has a nearby Amtrak station in adjacent Berlin. The Vermonter (once daily) and Shuttle (multiple daily arrivals/departures) provide service to destinations throughout the northeastern United States. There are also plans underway for a Springfield–Hartford–New Haven commuter rail, which would have Berlin as one of its stations.

Bradley International Airport (BDL) in Windsor Locks and Tweed New Haven Airport (HVN) in East Haven are the closest commercial airports to New Britain.

Notable people

 Paul S. Amenta (1922–2014), state senator
 Anita Antoinette (born 1989), reggae singer and songwriter
 Charles Avedisian (1917–1983), NB athletic director (1952–1966), member of 1944 New York Football Giants team ranked as #1 defensive unit in NFL history
 Robert S. Barton (1925–2009), computer designer and system architect, inventor of stack architecture
 Christopher A. Bray, member of the Vermont House of Representatives and Vermont Senate
 Elihu Burritt (1810–1879), diplomat, philanthropist, social activist, appointed by Abraham Lincoln as U.S. Consul in Birmingham, England
 Harold V. Camp (1935–2022), lawyer, politician, and businessman
 Walter Camp (1859–1925), Yale football player and coach, often referred to as the "Father of American Football"
 Phillip Corbin (1824–1910), founder of P&F Corbin Co. – a major manufacturer of locks and keys
 Steve Dalkowski (1939–2020), former pitcher in the minor leagues famous for his high speed fastball
 Daym Drops (born 1977), YouTube food reviewer
 Anna Eshoo (born 1942), U.S. Representative of California's 18th congressional district
 Willie Hall (born 1949), linebacker for the Super Bowl XI champion Oakland Raiders; Pulaski High School, University of Southern California
 Charles K. Hamilton (1881–1914), aviator
 Harry Jacunski (1915–2003), professional football player with Green Bay Packers, member of Fordham University Seven Blocks of Granite, Yale football coach for 33 years
 Nancy Johnson (born 1935), U.S. Representative for 5th and 6th CT districts (1983–2007)
 Byron Jones (born 1992), NFL player currently free safety for the Dallas Cowboys and unofficial world record holder of the standing long jump
 Tebucky Jones (born 1974), professional football player
 James Kilbourne (1770–1850), founder of Worthington, Ohio
 David LaFlamme (born 1941), virtuoso violinist in both classical and rock music
 Tony Leone (born 1969), rock and jazz drummer
 Sol LeWitt (1928–2007), Conceptual artist
 Bruce H. Mahan (1930–1982), noted Professor of Chemistry at UC-Berkeley, thesis advisor of Nobel Laureate Y.T. Lee
 Paul Manafort (born 1949), lobbyist, advisor to political campaigns of Ronald Reagan, George H. W. Bush, Robert Dole, George W. Bush, John McCain and Donald Trump
 Thomas J. Meskill (1928–2007), NB Mayor (1962–1964), Governor (1971–1975), appointed by Richard Nixon to the US Court of Appeals for 2nd Circuit (1975–2007)
 Chris Murphy (born 1973), U.S. Congressman for 5th CT district (2007–2013) and U.S. Senator for Connecticut (2013–present)
 Lamar Odom (born 1979), St. Thomas Aquinas basketball great, NBA player with the Los Angeles Clippers, Miami Heat, Los Angeles Lakers and Dallas Mavericks
 Jon Olsen (born 1969), swimmer, winner of four Olympic gold medals
 Charles Patterson, author and historian
 Carl Pavano (born 1976), professional baseball player
 Joe Porcaro, drummer in Los Angeles and father to the Porcaro brothers who founded the band [Toto]
 Charles J. Prestia (1909–1953), Secretary of the State of Connecticut from 1945 to 1947
 Frank W. Putnam (1917–2006), biochemist, born in New Britain
 Charles Quigley (1906–1964), actor
 Adolfas Ramanauskas (1918–1957), one of the prominent leaders of the Lithuanian partisans
 Abraham A. Ribicoff (1910–1998), Congressman (1949–1953), Governor (1955–1961), Secretary of Health, Education and Welfare (1961–1962), U.S. Senator from Connecticut (1963–1981)
 Velvet Sky (born 1981), ring name of professional wrestler Jamie Szantyr with Total Nonstop Action Wrestling
 George Springer (born 1989), professional baseball player currently with the Toronto Blue Jays
 Frederick Trent Stanley (1802–1883), first mayor of NB (1870), founder of Stanley Bolt Manufacturing (1843) that became The Stanley Works (1857) and (2010) Stanley Black & Decker
 Erin Stewart (born 1987), Mayor of NB (2013–), currently (2016) youngest female mayor in United States
 Tom Thibodeau (born 1958), current head coach of the New York Knicks of the NBA

Sister cities
New Britain's sister cities are:
Atsugi, Japan
Giannitsa, Greece
Pułtusk, Poland
Rastatt, Germany
Solarino, Italy

References

Further reading 
 History of New Britain by Camp, New Britain, 1889
 Legendary Locals of New Britain by Amy Melissa Kirby, 2014
 A Walk Around Walnut Hill, 1975, by Kenneth Larson
 New Britain, by Alfred Andrews, 1867
 A History of New Britain, by Herbert E. Fowler, 1960
 The Story of New Britain, by Lillian Hart Tryon, 1925
 Images of America, New Britain, by Arlene Palmer, 1995
 New Britain, The City of Invention, by Patrick Thibodeau

External links

 City of New Britain
 
 BBC special on the Polish community in New Britain, 2010 (4 min.)

 
Cities in Connecticut
Cities in Hartford County, Connecticut
Populated places established in 1687
1687 establishments in Connecticut
Polish communities in the United States
Greater Hartford
Hispanic and Latino American culture in Connecticut